The 2012–13 Texas State Bobcats men's basketball team represented Texas State University during the 2012–13 NCAA Division I men's basketball season. The Bobcats, led by seventh year head coach Doug Davalos, played their home games at Strahan Coliseum and were first year members of the Western Athletic Conference. They finished the season 12–22, 5–13 in WAC play to finish in seventh place. They advanced to the semifinals of the WAC tournament where they lost to New Mexico State.

This was their only season as a member of the WAC as they joined the Sun Belt Conference in July 2013.

Roster

Schedule

|-
!colspan=9| Regular season

|-
!colspan=9| WAC tournament

References

Texas State Bobcats men's basketball seasons
Texas State
2012 in sports in Texas
2013 in sports in Texas